Denis Francis Jones (12 October 1906 – 6 May 1987) was an Irish Fine Gael politician. A school teacher by profession, he was an unsuccessful candidate at the December 1955 by-election. He was elected to Dáil Éireann as a Fine Gael Teachta Dála (TD) for the Limerick West constituency at the 1957 general election. He was re-elected at each subsequent general election until he retired from politics at the 1977 general election. He served as Leas-Cheann Comhairle (deputy chairperson) of the Dáil from 1967 to 1977.

He was educated at Rockwell College, and St Patrick's College, Dublin, where he trained as a teacher. He married Anne O'Donnell, and they had four daughters. He was active in the GAA and Muintir na Tíre.

References

1906 births
1987 deaths
Fine Gael TDs
Members of the 16th Dáil
Members of the 17th Dáil
Members of the 18th Dáil
Members of the 19th Dáil
Members of the 20th Dáil
Politicians from County Limerick
Irish schoolteachers
People educated at Rockwell College
Alumni of St Patrick's College, Dublin